Nationality words link to articles with information on the nation's poetry or literature (for instance, Irish or France).

Events

Works

United Kingdom
 John Banim and Michael Banim, The Chaunt of the Cholera
 Henry Glassford Bell, Summer and Winter Hours
 Thomas Campbell, Poland: A Poem. Lines on the View from St. Leonard's
 James Hogg, Songs, by the Ettrick Shepherd
 Thomas Hood, The Dream of Eugene Aram, the Murderer
 Charles Lamb, anonymously published, Satan in Search of a Wife
 Walter Savage Landor, Gebir, Count Julian and Other Poems (Geber originally published 1798; Count Julian originally published 1812)
 Winthrop Mackworth Praed, The Ascent of Elijah
 Letitia Elizabeth Landon, writing under the pen name "L.E.L." Fisher's Drawing Room Scrap Book, 1832

United States
 William Cullen Bryant, "Song of Marion's Men", lyric poem, about Francis Marion, an American military figure in the American Revolution
 Oliver Wendell Holmes, Sr., "The Last Leaf", about an aging participant in the Boston Tea Party
 Lowell Mason, Church Psalmody
 Edgar Allan Poe, Poems by Edgar Allan Poe, Second Edition, including early, unrevised versions of some of the author's most significant verses, including "To Helen", "Israfel" and "The Doomed City"; the preface, "Letter to B", discusses Poe's critical theories, much of which was borrowed from Samuel Taylor Coleridge
 Samuel Francis Smith, "America", five stanzas; one of the most popular patriotic hymns in the United States, written at Lowell Mason's request; composed in 30 minutes; set to the music of the British anthem "God Save the King" and first sung at an Independence Day gathering in Boston; known for its opening line "My country 'tis of thee", published by Mason in The Choir 1832
 William Joseph Snelling, Truth: A New Year's Gift for Scribblers, a verse satire on contemporary poets, calling many of them inferior, especially those portraying American Indians with stereotypes
 John Greenleaf Whittier, Legends of New-England in Prose and Verse, the author's first book; uncomfortable with the gothic style of the volume, Whittier suppressed it later
 Emma Hart Willard, The Fulfillment of a Promise, includes "Rocked in the Cradle of the Deep", about the poet's trip home from Europe, which became a very popular poem set to music by Joseph P. Knight
 Nathaniel Parker Willis, Poem Delivered Before the Society of United Brothers

Other
 Victor Hugo, Les Feuilles d'automne, France
 Giacomo Leopardi, Canti, Italy
 George Métivier, Rimes Guernesiaises, Guernsey

Births
Death years link to the corresponding "[year] in poetry" article:
 March 18 – David Mills (died 1903), Canadian poet, politician, author and jurist
 June 13 – James Clerk Maxwell (died 1879), Scottish  mathematician and theoretical physicist whose poetry was published by a friend in 1881, two years after his death
 July 7 –  Jane Elizabeth Conklin (died 1914), American poet and religious writer
 September 12 – Álvares de Azevedo (died 1852), Brazilian
 October 17 – Isa Craig (died 1903), Scots
 November 8 – Robert Bulwer-Lytton (died 1891), English novelist and poet
 December 22 – Charles Stuart Calverley, English poet, wit and literary father of what has been called "the university school of humour"
 Date not known – Charles R. Thatcher (thought to have died in 1882), Australian

Deaths
Birth years link to the corresponding "[year] in poetry" article:
 January 14 – Henry Mackenzie (born 1745), Scottish novelist, writer, critic and poet
 January 21 – Ludwig Achim von Arnim (born 1781), German poet and novelist
 March 8 - Laurence Hynes Halloran, 64, Irish-Australian pioneer schoolteacher and journalist; publishes poetry before being shipped to Australia as a convict
 May 11 – John Trumbull, 81 (born 1750), American
 June 30 - William Roscoe (born 1753), English poet
 December 23 - Henry Louis Vivian Derozio, 22 (born 1809), Indian poet writing in English and academic of Eurasian and Portuguese descent
 Also - Ryōkan 良寛 (born 1758), Japanese waka poet and calligrapher, Buddhist monk, often a hermit

See also

 List of years in poetry
 List of years in literature
 19th century in poetry
 19th century in literature
 Golden Age of Russian Poetry (1800–1850)
 Weimar Classicism period in Germany, commonly considered to have begun in 1788  and to have ended either in 1805, with the death of Friedrich Schiller, or 1832, with the death of Goethe
 Lists of poets
 Poetry

Notes

19th-century poetry
Poetry